Brokmann or Brokman is a Dutch surname. Notable people with the surname include:

Shimshon Brokman (born 1957), Israeli Olympic sailor
Theo Brokmann Sr. (1893–1956), Dutch footballer
Theo Brokmann Jr. (1922–2003), Dutch footballer

Dutch-language surnames